The concept of armed violence reduction (AVR) has gained significant in importance after the 2006 Geneva Declaration on Armed Violence and Development. According to OECD, more than 740,000 people die each year as a result of the violence associated with armed conflicts and large- and small-scale criminality. Furthermore, armed violence impedes humanitarian and socio-economic development and, hence, it is an obstruction to achieving the Millennium Development Goals (MDG).

Key numbers on armed violence from the Geneva Declaration on Armed Violence and Development 

 More than 740,000 people have died directly or indirectly from armed violence - both conflict and criminal violence - every year in recent years.
 More than 540,000 of these deaths are violent, with the vast majority occurring in non-conflict settings.
 At least 200,000 people - and perhaps many thousands more - have died each year in conflict zones from non-violent causes (such as malnutrition, dysentery, or other easily preventable diseases) that resulted from the effects of war on populations.
 Between 2004 and 2007, at least 208,300 violent deaths were recorded in armed conflicts - an average of 52,000 people killed per year. This is a conservative estimate including only recorded deaths: the real total may be much higher.
 The annual economic cost of armed violence in non-conflict settings, in terms of lost productivity due to violent deaths, is USD 95 billion and could reach as high as USD 163 billion - 0.14 percent of the annual global GDP.

Armed violence reduction is therefore essential for the achievement of the Millennium Development Goals.

See also 
 Small Arms Survey
 Insecurity Insight

References

External links 
 Geneva Declaration on Armed Violence and Development
 Millennium Development Goals

Nonviolence
War
Conflict (process)